38 Special Live From Texas is a live album by the southern rock band 38 Special, recorded in 2009 and released in 2011.

Track listing
Rockin' into the Night
20th Century Fox
Back Where You Belong
Wild-Eyed Southern Boys
The Squeeze
If I'd Been the One
Help Somebody
Fantasy Girl
Trooper with an Attitude
Medley: Back to Paradise
Medley: Somebody Like You
Medley: Teacher Teacher
Medley: Rough Housin'
Medley: Stone Cold Believer
Medley: Like No Other Night
Medley: Second Chance
Caught Up in You
Chain Lightnin'
Hold On Loosely
Back in the U.S.A.
Travelin' Band

Personnel
Donnie Van Zant - lead and background vocals
Don Barnes - guitar, lead and background vocals
Bobby Capps - keyboards, lead and background vocals
Danny Chauncey - guitar, keyboards
Larry Junstrom - bass guitar
Gary Moffatt - drums

References

38 Special (band) albums
2011 albums